Horodets is a village in Korosten Raion (district) in Zhytomyr Oblast of northern Ukraine. As of the 2001 census, its population is 754.

Notable Person 
 Halyna Hutchins (1979–2021), cinematographer

References

Villages in Korosten Raion